Sainte-Marie-du-Lac-Nuisement is a commune in the Marne department in north-eastern France.

Geography
The river Blaise flows through the commune.

See also
Communes of the Marne department

References

Saintemariedulacnuisement